Adam Pavlásek was the defending champion but lost in the quarterfinals to Martin Kližan.

Horacio Zeballos won the title after defeating Gerald Melzer 6–3, 6–4 in the final.

Seeds

Draw

Finals

Top half

Bottom half

References
 Main Draw
 Qualifying Draw

Poprad-Tatry ATP Challenger Tour - Singles
2016 Singles